George Washington French (1823 – December 8, 1887) was a justice of the Dakota Territorial Supreme Court from 1869 to 1873.

Life and career
Born in Thomaston, Maine, French began his career of public service as a county clerk in Maine. In 1869, Dr. Burleigh, a longtime friend of both French and President Andrew Johnson secured the appointment of French as chief justice of the Dakota Territorial Supreme Court, to succeed Ara Bartlett. His tenure yielded an unflattering anecdote in Doane Robinson's History of South Dakota:

On March 15, 1873, President Ulysses S. Grant nominated French for a second term on the territorial supreme court, but withdrew the nomination within days and instead nominated Alanson H. Barnes to the seat.

Following his service in the Dakota Territory, French served as Secretary of the Territory of Wyoming from 1875 to 1879, and later returned to Thomaston, Maine to practice law. An 1880 report erroneously identified French as having been appointed chief justice of Arizona, the appointee actually having been C. G. W. French.

Personal life and death
French died after a short illness at the residence of Oliver E. Copeland, in Orlando, Florida, at the age of 64. French had travelled there three weeks earlier to spend the winter, his wife and son having stayed in Cambridge, Massachusetts.

References

1823 births
1887 deaths
People from Thomaston, Maine
Justices of the Dakota Territorial Supreme Court
United States Article I federal judges appointed by Andrew Johnson
Wyoming Territory officials